Live and Learn is a collaborative studio album by American rappers Indo G and the Ghetto Troopers. It was released on May 30, 2000 via 404 Music Group.

Track listing
 "Out There" - 3:55
 "Pimps" (feat. K-Rock) - 4:12
 "Boy You Ain't No Soldier" (featuring Kingpin Skinny Pimp) - 3:40
 "Live and Learn" - 3:53
 "We Comin'" - 4:41
 "That's the Bad Guy (Posse)" - 4:29
 "Ghetto Troopers (Posse)" - 3:39
 "One Life to Live" - 3:30
 "You Ain't Quick Enough" - 4:12
 "Ride Together" - 3:47
 "Cum Inside" - 4:11
 "Would U Be Ready" - 3:18
 "Throw It Up" - 4:31
 "Y'all Ain't Ready" - 3:04
 "Cash Flo" (featuring T-Mac & P-Squad) - 3:37
 "What Can You Say?" (featuring Primo) - 4:13
 "Do You Wanna Ryde" (featuring Nasty Nardo) - 2:58
 "Black Kennedys" (featuring the Black Kennedys) - 4:24

External links

2000 albums
Indo G albums
Collaborative albums